Plasmodium traguli is a parasite of the genus Plasmodium subgenus Vinckeia. As in all Plasmodium species, P. traguli has both vertebrate and insect hosts. This particular species infects mouse deer in Southeast Asia.

Taxonomy 
The parasite was first described by Garnham and Edeson in 1962.

Distribution 
This parasite is found in Malaysia and Sri Lanka.

Vectors
Anopheles baezai, Anopheles letifer, Anopheles maculatus, Anopheles roperi and Anopheles umbrosus are known vectors.

Mansonia crassipes may be a vector.

Hosts 
This species infects the mouse deer (Tragulus javanicus).

References 

traguli